Persiba Stadium (also known as Parikesit Stadium) is a multi-use stadium in Balikpapan, Indonesia. It is currently used mostly for football matches and is used as the home stadium for Persiba Balikpapan. The stadium has a capacity of 12,500 people after the 2008 renovation.

In 2008, the stadium was renovated to accommodate local team Persiba Balikpapan to compete in Indonesia Super League and Copa Dji Sam Soe 2008/09 season. Lighting and spectators' seating were added as new features. Improvement in the dressing room, grass, scoreboard, and other amenities were carried out.

The stadium was to be used by Persiba Balikpapan to host football matches against its guests beginning January 2009.

Footnotes

Defunct sports venues in Indonesia
Defunct football venues in Indonesia
Sports venues in Indonesia
Football venues in Indonesia
Sports venues in East Kalimantan
Football venues in East Kalimantan
Sports venues in Balikpapan
Football venues in Balikpapan
Buildings and structures in Balikpapan
Balikpapan
Buildings and structures in East Kalimantan